The Chicago Reader, or Reader (stylized as ЯEADER), is an American alternative weekly newspaper in Chicago, Illinois, noted for its literary style of journalism and coverage of the arts, particularly film and theater. It was founded by a group of friends from Carleton College.

The Reader is recognized as a pioneer among alternative weeklies for both its creative nonfiction and its commercial scheme. Richard Karpel, then-executive director of the Association of Alternative Newsweeklies, wrote:

[T]he most significant historical event in the creation of the modern alt-weekly occurred in Chicago in 1971, when the Chicago Reader pioneered the practice of free circulation, a cornerstone of today's alternative papers. The Reader also developed a new kind of journalism, ignoring the news and focusing on everyday life and ordinary people.

After being owned by same four founders since 1971, by the early 2000s profits and readership of the Reader were dropping, and ownership changed several times between 2007 and 2018. In 2022, the owners transferred the Reader to a new non-profit organization, the Reader Institute for Community Journalism.

On June 22, 2020, the Reader, citing a 90% drop in advertising revenue due to COVID-19 shutdowns, announced that it was pivoting from a weekly to a biweekly print schedule, with a renewed focus on digital content and storytelling and a refreshed special issues calendar. The Reader is dated every other Thursday and distributed free on Wednesday and Thursday via street boxes and cooperating retail outlets.  the paper claimed to have nearly 1,200 locations in the Chicago metropolitan area and circulation of 60,000.

Publication history

1971–1995 
The Chicago Reader was founded by Robert A. Roth, who grew up in the Chicago suburb of Arlington Heights. His ambition was to start a weekly publication for young Chicagoans like Boston's The Phoenix and Boston After Dark. Those papers were sold on newsstands but were also given away, mostly on campuses, to bolster circulation. Roth believed that 100-percent free circulation would work better, and he persuaded several friends from Carleton College, including Robert E. McCamant, Thomas J. Rehwaldt and Thomas K. Yoder, to join him in his venture. They scraped together about $16,000 in capital and published the first issue, 16 pages, on October 1, 1971.

One year later, in its first anniversary issue, the Reader published an article titled "What Kind of Paper is This, Anyway?" in which it answered "Questions we've heard over and over in the past year." This article reported that the paper had lost nearly $20,000 in its first ten months of operation but that the owners were "confident it will work out in the end." It explained the rationale behind free circulation and the paper's unconventional editorial philosophy: "Why doesn't the Reader print news? Tom Wolfe wrote us, 'The Future of the newspaper (as opposed to the past, which is available at every newsstand) lies in your direction, i.e., the sheet willing to deal with "the way we live now."' That sums up our thoughts quite well: we find street sellers more interesting than politicians, and musicians more interesting than the Cubs. They are closer to home."

In its early years the Reader was published out of apartments shared by the owner-founders, Roth, McCamant, Rehwaldt and Yoder. The first apartment was in Hyde Park—the University of Chicago neighborhood on the south side of Chicago—and the second was in Rogers Park on the far north side. Working for ownership in lieu of pay, the owner-founders ultimately owned more than 90% of the company. In 1975 the paper began to earn a profit, incorporated, and rented office space in the downtown area that later came to be known as River North.

In 1979, a reporter for the Daily Herald of Arlington Heights, Illinois, called the Reader "the fastest growing alternative weekly in the U.S." In 1986, an article in the Chicago Tribune estimated the Reader'''s annual revenues at $6.7 million. In 1996, Crain's Chicago Business projected revenue of $14.6 million. The National Journal's Convention Daily (published during the 1996 Democratic National Convention in Chicago) reported that the Reader was "an enormous financial success. It's now as thick as many Sunday papers and is published in four sections that total around 180 pages." This report put the circulation at 138,000.

 1995–2006 
The Reader began experimenting with electronic distribution in 1995 with an automated telephone service called "SpaceFinder", which offered search and "faxback" delivery of the paper's apartment rental ads, one of its most important franchises. Later in 1995 the paper's "Matches" personal ads were made available on the Web, and in early 1996 the SpaceFinder fax system was adapted for Web searching. Also in 1996 the Reader partnered with Yahoo to bring its entertainment listings online and introduced a Web site and an AOL user area built around its popular syndicated column "The Straight Dope".

The Reader became so profitable in the late 1990s that it added a suburban edition, The Reader's Guide to Arts & Entertainment, but by 2006 it was operating at a loss. It faced severe competitive pressure starting near the turn of the century, as some of its key elements became widely available online. Numerous websites offered entertainment listings, schedules, and reviews. Classified ads, a major source of revenue in the 1990s, migrated to Craigslist and other online services that published ads for free and made them easily searchable.

By 2000 much of the paper's content was available online, but the Reader still resisted publishing a Web version of the entire paper. It concentrated on database information like classifieds and listings, leaving the long cover stories and many other articles to be delivered in print only. In 2005, when many similar publications had long been offering all their content online, the Reader began offering its articles in PDF format, showing pages just as they appeared in print — an attempt to provide value to the display advertisers who accounted for much of the paper's revenue. By 2007 the PDFs were gone and all of the paper's content was available online, along with a variety of blogs and Web-only features.

A 2008 article in the Columbia Journalism Review by Edward McClelland, a former Reader staff writer (then known as Ted Kleine), faulted the Reader for having been slow to embrace the Web and suggested that it had trouble appealing to a new generation of young readers. "Alternative weeklies are expected to be eternally youthful," McClelland wrote. "The Reader is finding that a tough act to pull off as it approaches forty." He also suggested the Reader had grown complacent "because it was still raking in ad profits through the early 2000s" and its troubles were aggravated by a 2004 makeover that included "features on fashion" and a "tattooed, twenty-seven-year-old stripper" writing a late-night party column. "The feeling was the Reader had to be reinvented ... and change its character."

 2007–2017 
After being owned by same four founders since 1971, ownership of the Reader changed several times between 2007 and 2018.

The precipitous decline in profits from 2004 to 2006 prompted owner-founder Tom Rehwaldt to file a lawsuit against the company. This lawsuit led to the sale of the Reader and its sibling, Washington City Paper to Creative Loafing in July 2007, publisher of alternative weeklies in Atlanta, Georgia; Charlotte, North Carolina; and Tampa and Sarasota, Florida. Creative Loafing filed for bankruptcy in September 2008. In August 2009, the bankruptcy court awarded the company to Creative Loafing's chief creditor, Atalaya Capital Management, which had loaned $30 million to pay for most of the purchase price for the Reader and the Washington City Paper.

In late 2007, under a budget cutback imposed by the new owners at Creative Loafing, the Reader laid off several of its most experienced journalists, including John Conroy, Harold Henderson, Tori Marlan and Steve Bogira. The paper had de-emphasized the tradition of offbeat feature stories in favor of theme issues and aggressive, opinionated reporting on city government, for example its extensive coverage of tax increment financing (TIFs) by Ben Joravsky, who has been a staff writer since the 1980s. Though the staff was much smaller than it was before the sale, many other key figures remained as of June 2010, including media critic Michael Miner, film critic J.R. Jones, arts reporter Deanna Isaacs, food writer Mike Sula, theater critic Albert Williams, and music writers Peter Margasak and Miles Raymer. In November 2009, James Warren, former managing editor for features at the Chicago Tribune, was named president and publisher. In March, 2010, Warren resigned. In June, longtime editor Alison True was fired by acting publisher Alison Draper and Creative Loafing CEO Marty Petty, sparking outrage among the paper's remaining audience. In July, Draper was named publisher, managing editor Kiki Yablon was promoted to editor, and Geoff Dougherty was named associate publisher. Dougherty had founded and subsequently closed the online Chi-Town Daily News and its successor, the print-and-online Chicago Current, which he closed to take the Reader job.

In 2012, the Chicago Reader was acquired by Wrapports LLC, parent company of the Chicago Sun-Times.

Managing editor Jake Malooley was formally named Editor-in-Chief in July 2015. In February 2018 Malooley was fired by phone at O'Hare Airport as he returned from his honeymoon by newly appointed Executive Editor Mark Konkol. Konkol was fired by Sun-Times Media only 19 days after his appointment, following the publication of a controversial editorial cartoon that was deemed to be race baiting.

On July 13, 2017, a consortium consisting of private investors & the Chicago Federation of Labor, led by businessman & former Chicago alderman Edwin Eisendrath, through Eisendrath's company, ST Acquisition Holdings, acquired the Chicago Sun-Times and the Chicago Reader from Wrapports, beating out Chicago-based publishing company Tronc for ownership.

 2018–2019
Effective October 1, 2018, Sun-Times Media sold the Reader to a private investment group, which formed an L3C to make the purchase. The major investors were Chicagoans Elzie Higginbottom and Leonard Goodman. Tracy Baim was named publisher and Anne Elizabeth Moore editor.  Moore's tenure as editor was short-lived; she abruptly departed in March 2019. In June 2019 Karen Hawkins and Sujay Kumar were announced as new editors in chief, previously managing editors who had been serving as interim editors in chief following Moore's departure. In November 2020, the Reader announced co-editor Hawkins would also serve as co-publisher with Baim, while Baim was also made president.

 2020–2023 

On June 22, 2020, the Reader, citing a 90% drop in advertising revenue due to COVID-19 shutdowns, announced that it was pivoting from a weekly to a biweekly print schedule, with a renewed focus on digital content and storytelling and a refreshed special issues calendar.

On May 16, 2022, ownership of the Reader was transferred to the new non-profit organization Reader Institute for Community Journalism.  The transfer had been delayed by a debilitating public dispute between publisher Tracy Baim and then-editor in chief Karen Hawkins on one side, and co-owner Leonard Goodman on the other, in 2021 and 2022.

Goodman, who had submitted a semi-regular column for the Reader since he and Higginbottom acquired the newspaper, wrote one (edited by Hawkins) in November 2021 about his hesitancy to vaccinate his young daughter against COVID-19. 

After the column appeared in print, objections from the editorial staff and a public outcry prompted Baim and Hawkins to first defend the column (Hawkins tweeted in defense of it and privately assured Goodman the column was "bulletproof") before changing their minds and commissioning a post-publication fact-check that found multiple inaccuracies and errors. Baim proposed publishing the fact-check online with the column, but Goodman and allied board members accused Baim of censorship and demanded her resignation before allowing the transfer to a nonprofit; she refused. Baim, Goodman, and the board remained in a stalemate for months, unable to reach an agreement. 

In April 2022 the newspaper's editorial union, saying the dispute threatened the future of the newspaper, mounted a public pressure campaign that culminated in protests outside of Goodman's mansion, and after two weeks, he agreed to give up ownership and allow the transfer to a nonprofit.

In June 2022, Hawkins left the Reader. In August, Baim announced that she would resign by the end of the year.

Enrique Limón, who previously worked for the Santa Fe Reporter and Salt Lake City Weekly, joined the newspaper as editor in chief in October 2022.

Solomon Lieberman was hired as new CEO and publisher in February 2023.

Salem Collo-Julin was named editor in chief in March 2023.

 Content 
The Reader was designed to serve young readers, mostly singles in their 20s, who in the early 1970s lived in distinct neighborhoods along Chicago's lakefront, such as Hyde Park, Lincoln Park, and Lake View. Later this demographic group moved west, to neighborhoods like Wicker Park, Bucktown, and Logan Square, and the Reader moved with them. The paper's appeal was based on a variety of elements. Most obvious early on was a focus on pop culture for a generation who were not served by the entertainment coverage of daily newspapers. Like many alternative weeklies, the Reader relied heavily on coverage and extensive listings of arts and cultural events, especially live music, film, and theater.

As the paper prospered and its budget expanded, investigative and political reporting became another important part of the mix. Reader articles by freelance writer David Moberg are credited with helping to elect Chicago's first black mayor, the late Harold Washington. Staff writer John Conroy wrote extensively, over a period of more than 17 years, on police torture in Chicago; his reporting was instrumental in the ouster and prosecution of Commander Jon Burge, the leader of a police torture ring, and in the release of several wrongly convicted prisoners from death row.

The Reader was perhaps best known for its deep, immersive style of literary journalism, publishing long, detailed cover stories, often on subjects that had little to do with the news of the day. An oft-cited example is a 19,000-word article on beekeeping by staff editor Michael Lenehan. This article won the AAAS Westinghouse Science Journalism Award, awarded by the American Association for the Advancement of Science, in 1978. Steve Bogira's 1988 article "A Fire in the Family" used an apartment-building fire as the starting point for a 15,000-word chronicle of life among the underclass, following three generations of a west-side family and touching on urban issues such as addiction, discrimination, crime, and teen pregnancy. It won the Peter Lisagor Award for Exemplary Journalism, awarded by the Chicago Headline Club. Ben Joravsky's "A Simple Game" followed a public high school basketball team for a full year. Published in two parts, a total of 40,000 words, it was reprinted in the anthology Best American Sportswriting 1993. The Reader has won 30 Alternative Newsweekly Awards since 1996.

Another element of the Readers appeal was its free classified ads to individuals. Ads were seen as another source of information alongside the journalism and listings.

 Design and format 
The original look of the Chicago Reader in 1971 was devised by owner-founder Bob McCamant. In 2004, a redesign by the Barcelona, Spain, firm of Jardi + Utensil introduced a new logo and extensive use of color, including a magazine-style cover. In 2007, under the ownership of Creative Loafing, the paper was converted to a single-section tabloid. In 2010, Publisher Alison Draper hired Chicago-based redesign consultant Ron Reason to help revamp the publication. Among changes introduced were a revitalized and rebranded music section titled B Side, an improvement in the paper's advertising design, quality glossy paper stock for covers and key inside spreads, and editorial destinations shepherded primarily by new editor Mara Shalhoup. A post-redesign checkup several months later revealed a robust page count, innovations in social media and reader engagement, and strong commitment from advertisers.

Related ventures
"The Straight Dope", by the pseudonymous Cecil Adams, was the Chicago Reader's first weekly column and one of the first features to be widely syndicated in the alternative press, at one time appearing in 35 papers. It was started on 2 February 1973 by Michael Lenehan and later written by Dave Kehr. In 1978 it was taken over by Ed Zotti, who continued to serve as Cecil's "assistant" as of January 2010. In 1984, Chicago Review Press published The Straight Dope, a compilation of columns; the cover named Cecil Adams as author and Zotti as editor. The title was picked up and republished by Ballantine, which published four more volumes between 1988 and 1999. In 1996, The Straight Dope became a user area on AOL; a short-lived TV series, produced by Andrew Rosen, on the A&E Network; and a Web site, Straightdope.com, which was named one of PC Magazine's Top 101 Web Sites and as of January 2010 was drawing nearly 1.2 million users per month.

The Los Angeles Reader began publishing in 1978 as a wholly owned subsidiary of Chicago Reader, Inc. It was the first newspaper to publish Matt Groening's comic strip Life in Hell and David Lynch's strip The Angriest Dog in the World. In 1989, the paper was sold to a company headed by its founding editor, James Vowell. In 1996, it was sold to and closed by New Times Media, which later became Village Voice Media.

The San Diego Reader was founded in 1972 by Jim Holman, who attended Carleton College and was one of the original group who established the Chicago Reader. Although Holman briefly owned shares in the Chicago paper, none of the Chicago owners had an interest in the San Diego paper. Holman used the Reader format and nameplate with the blessings of his friends in Chicago.

Various other Readers have been published, but the San Diego and Los Angeles papers are the only ones affiliated with the Chicago Reader. In the late 1970s, Chicago Reader, Inc. (CRI) sued the Twin Cities Reader for trademark infringement, arguing that the Chicago Reader had given special meaning to the name "Reader". The federal appeals court ultimately ruled that the term was "merely descriptive" and thus could not be protected as a trademark.

The East Bay Express, which serves the San Francisco Bay area, was co-founded in 1978 by Nancy Banks, a co-founder of the Chicago Reader, and editor John Raeside. Chicago Reader owners invested in the paper and eventually CRI held a major stake. The paper was sold in 2001 to New Times Media, which became Village Voice Media and in 2007 sold it to editor Stephen Buel and a group of investors.Washington City Paper was founded in 1981 by Russ Smith and Alan Hirsch, who had founded Baltimore City Paper in 1977. Originally named 1981, the name was changed the following year. Owners of the Chicago Reader invested in the Washington paper in 1982 and eventually controlled 100 percent of the stock. In 2007, they sold their interest in both papers to Creative Loafing, Inc.The Reader's Guide to Arts & Entertainment was published as a suburban extension of the Chicago Reader in 1996. Before then, the Reader had avoided distribution in all but the closest suburbs of Chicago. The Reader's Guide was a scaled-down version of the Reader, printed as a one-section tabloid meant to satisfy suburban demand for Reader content and advertising. In 2007, it was closed and distribution of the complete Chicago Reader was expanded to the suburbs.

The Ruxton Group, originally called the Reader Group, was formed by CRI in 1984 as a national advertising representative for the Reader, Washington City Paper, and other large-market alternative weeklies. In 1995 the company was sold to New Times Media, which became Village Voice Media and renamed Ruxton as the Voice Media Group.

Index Newspapers is the company that publishes The Stranger in Seattle, Washington, and the Portland Mercury in Portland, Oregon. In 2002, CRI invested in Index and took a minority interest.

Quarterfold, Inc. is a company formed by most of the former owners of Chicago Reader, Inc. to succeed that company and hold assets that were not included in the sale to Creative Loafing. Quarterfold's chief asset is its ownership interest in Index Newspapers.Amsterdam Weekly was a free, English-language weekly published in the Netherlands from May 2004 through December 2008. , it exists in limited form online. The paper was started by Todd Savage, who had been a writer and typesetter for the Chicago Reader in the late 1990s. The Reader was a major investor. In 2008, the paper was sold to Yuval Sigler, publisher of Time Out Tel Aviv, who with assets and staff including Savage launched Time Out Amsterdam'' in October 2008.

References

External links
Chicago Reader website
Chicago Reader History, a small collection of articles and documents
 Chicago Reader Records at the Newberry Library
 Chicago Reader Photographs: Performance collection at the Newberry Library
 Chicago Reader Photographs: News Collection at the Newberry Library
 Chicago Reader Artwork Collection at the Newberry Library

Alternative weekly newspapers published in the United States
Newspapers published in Chicago
Free newspapers
Newspapers established in 1971
1971 establishments in Illinois